Sam Stanley may refer to:

 Samuel L. Stanley, an American educator, biomedical researcher, and university president
 Sam Stanley (Twin Peaks), a character of Twin Peaks, portrayed by Kiefer Sutherland
 Sam Stanley (rugby union), British rugby union player